The Federation of Awarding Bodies is the British trade association for awarding bodies and professional associations. The current chief executive is Tom Bewick.

History
It was founded in 2000.

Function
It represents providers of technical vocational education qualifications, not providers of general academic qualifications such as A Levels and GCSEs.

Structure
While the Federation has a mailing address in Grosvenor Square, London, the staff are home based.
As of 2023, FAB has 8 members of staff and Board of 2 co-chairs, a treasurer and 9 non-executive directors. It represents 117 full members and holds two flagship conferences each year, one of which is dedicated to End Point Assessment (EPA), most commonly associated with apprenticeships.

See also
 Association of Learning Providers
 Institute of Employability Professionals
 Institute for Learning
 TVET (Technical and Vocational Education and Training)
 UK Register of Learning Providers

References

External links
 FAB

Education in the City of Westminster
Educational qualifications in the United Kingdom
Further education colleges in the United Kingdom
Organisations based in the City of Westminster
Trade associations based in the United Kingdom
Vocational education in the United Kingdom